Hayden Rhys Hackney (born 26 June 2002) is a professional footballer who plays as a midfielder for EFL Championship club Middlesbrough. Born in England, he is a youth international for Scotland.

Early life
Hackney was born in Redcar.

Club career
He joined Middlesbrough's academy at under-10 level. Having been part of the Middlesbrough team that reached the under-18 Premier League Cup final in 2019, he signed his first professional contract with the club on 26 June 2019, his 17th birthday. Shortly after being named on the first-team bench for a match against Barnsley in November 2019, he was praised by Middlesbrough manager Jonathan Woodgate, with Woodgate claiming "Hayden Hackney deserves to be there because he's been outstanding for the Under-23s". He made his senior debut on 9 January 2021, starting in a 2–1 FA Cup defeat away to Brentford. He made his league debut for the club in the final match of the season as a substitute in a 3–0 defeat to Wycombe Wanderers. He signed a new two-year contract with the club later that month.

On 31 August 2021, Hackney joined EFL League Two side Scunthorpe United on loan until January 2022. After playing in the majority of games in the first half of the season, Hackney's loan was extended to last until the end of the season. In the 15th minute of a 2–0 defeat to Exeter City, Hackney was caught spitting at an opponent. The referee did not see this at the time, but after the game, the Football Association confirmed that Hackney had admitted to spitting and was given a six-game suspension.

On 19 October 2022, Hackney scored his first goal for Middlesbrough against Wigan Athletic in a 4–1 win.

International career
Hackney represented England at under-15 level. He is also eligible to represent Scotland because his mother was born in Edinburgh, and he was selected by the Scotland under-21 team in November 2022.

Style of play
Hackney plays as a central midfielder. He often plays as a deep-lying playmaker due to his ability in possession of the ball.

Career statistics

References

2002 births
Living people
People from Redcar
Footballers from North Yorkshire
Scottish footballers
Scotland under-21 international footballers
English footballers
England youth international footballers
Scottish people of English descent
English people of Scottish descent
Association football midfielders
Middlesbrough F.C. players
Scunthorpe United F.C. players
English Football League players